L'Atlantide is a 1992 French-Italian adventure film directed by Bob Swaim and starring Tchéky Karyo, Christopher Thompson and Jean Rochefort. It tells the story of a former soldier who searches for a man who has disappeared, and comes into contact with a mysterious and attractive queen from an ancient dynasty. It is based on Pierre Benoit's 1919 novel Atlantida, which had been adapted for film several times before. The film premiered in France on 30 December 1992.

Cast
 Tchéky Karyo as Lieutenant Morhange
 Christopher Thompson as St. Avit
 Victoria Mahoney as Antinea
 Anna Galiena as Amira
 Jean Rochefort as Le Meige
  as Bielowsky
 Orso Maria Guerrini as Ben Cheikh
  as Tanit
 Michele Melega as Ferriere
 Claudia Gerini as Sophie
  as Nirval
 Fernando Rey as Père Mauritius

References

External links
 

1992 films
1990s adventure films
French adventure films
Italian adventure films
Films directed by Bob Swaim
Films based on Atlantida
Films set in deserts
1990s English-language films
1990s French films